The South American Union of Italian Emigrants is an Italian political party representing Italian minorities in South America, especially Argentina and Brazil.

History

In the 2006 general election the party won 4.7% of the vote in the South American constituency of the Chamber of Deputies. USEI did not participate in the 2008 general election, but continued to be active and improve its network.

In the 2013 general election USEI won 13.3% of the vote in the South American constituency and elected Renata Bueno to the Chamber of Deputies. Bueno was the daughter of Rubens Bueno, a long-time member of the Brazilian Chamber of Deputies for the Brazilian Socialist Party. After the election, she formed a parliamentary alliance with the alternative Associative Movement Italians Abroad (MAIE) within the Mixed Group of the Chamber, that lasted for two and half years.

Despite the fact that USEI's and Sangregorio's political orientation was broadly centre-right, Bueno, due to her family's political upbringing, started to be supportive of the Democratic Party (PD), the country's main centre-left party, and, particularly, its leader Matteo Renzi, who served as Prime Minister from February 2014 to December 2016.

Curiously enough, in November 2015, Bueno joined forces with Identity and Action (IdeA), a centre-right party opposed to Renzi. Subsequently, she formed a sub-group, named after the USEI (and, later, "USEI–IdeA"), within the Mixed Group of the Chamber, along with Aniello Formisano of Italy of Values (IdV), a party traditionally affiliated to the centre-left, and Guglielmo Vaccaro of Unique Italy (IU). Right after its formation, the sub-group was joined also by the other two IdeA deputies, Eugenia Roccella and Vincenzo Piso. The USEI–IdeA sub-group was dissolved in May 2017. After that, Bueno was affiliated with Civics and Innovators (CI) and Direction Italy (DI). Sangregorio, who had opposed the constitutional reform proposed by Renzi with the 2016 constitutional referendum (Renzi lost and resigned from Prime Minister), was not willing to field Bueno again as a USEI candidate.

In the 2018 general election the party won 18.7% of the vote in the South American constituency and Sangregorio was elected to the Chamber of Deputies, while Bueno led the Popular Civic List to 6.3% (compared to 0.5% in Italy) and was not elected. USEI ran also for the Senate, obtaining 20.4% and the election of  Adriano Cario. In May 2018 Cario left the USEI and switched to MAIE.

On 18 December 2019, USEI formed with the centrist allies of Forza Italia (Alliance of the Centre and Us with Italy) and the centre-right Cambiamo! the new sub-group within the Mixed Group "Noi con l'Italia-USEI-Cambiamo!-Alleanza di Centro".

Electoral results

Italian Parliament

References

External links
Official website

Italian expatriate representation parties
Italy
Political parties established in 2006
2006 establishments in Argentina
Italian-Brazilian culture